Miguel Oswaldo Pérez (born 8 March 1945) is an Ecuadorian footballer. He played in five matches for the Ecuador national football team from 1975 to 1979. He was also part of Ecuador's squad for the 1975 Copa América tournament.

References

External links
 

1945 births
Living people
Ecuadorian footballers
Ecuador international footballers
Place of birth missing (living people)
Association footballers not categorized by position